Paranoia Excessory Pack is a 1987 role-playing game supplement for Paranoia published by West End Games.

Contents
Paranoia Excessory Pack includes three copies of the following forms in triplicate: the R&D Experimental Equipment report form, the Equipment/Weapon/Vehicle request Form, and the Treason form.

Reception
Richard A. Edwards reviewed Paranoia Excessory Pack in Space Gamer/Fantasy Gamer No. 81. Edwards commented that "I think West End has given us a selection of gimmicks for which no GM will hold off on obtaining, but I wish they would have included an adventure, a mini-adventure even, to make me feel like I was getting more for my money than some extra copies of forms."

Reviews
Dragon #132

References

Paranoia supplements
Role-playing game supplements introduced in 1987